The intellectual property rights on photographs are protected in different jurisdictions by the laws governing copyright and moral rights. In some cases photography may be restricted by civil or criminal law. Publishing certain photographs can be restricted by privacy or other laws. Photography can be generally restricted in the interests of public morality and the protection of children.

Reactions to photography differ between societies, and even where there are no official restrictions there may be objections to photographing people or places. Reactions may range from complaints to violence for photography which is not illegal.

Australia

General 
Australia's laws in relation to this matter are similar to that of the United States. In Australia you can generally photograph anything or anyone in a public place without permission assuming that it isn't being used in an otherwise illegal way such as defamation and does not contain copyrighted material. Furthermore photographing in a place where people would reasonably expect to be afforded privacy such as in a public restroom may also be illegal.

Private property 
While one can generally photograph private property and the people within it if the photographer is not within the bounds of the private property and cannot be asked to stop or delete the images, the owner can restrict recording whilst the photographer is on the private property. Failure to comply with orders to stop recording on the private property is not a criminal offence although it may be against the terms or policy of entrance and the photographer may be asked to leave; if they refuse to leave, they may be liable for trespassing.

Publishing and rights 
The photographer generally has full rights of the images meaning they can also publish it to something like social media without permission from the people in the image. Although there are exceptions in the following scenarios.
 A breach of the Privacy Act 1988
 Was taken while trespassing on private property
 A breach of duty, such as sharing confidential information

A photographer can generally also not be forced to show or delete the images unless the photographic practices were at breach of the law.

Commercial purposes 
If you are seeking to photograph for commercial purposes you may be required to gain permission from anyone who was involved in the film or photograph. Commercial purposes usually means that you are photographing for financial gain or to promote goods or services.

United Kingdom

Legal restrictions on photography

In the United Kingdom there are no laws forbidding photography of private property from a public place. Photography is not restricted on land if the landowner has given permission to be on the land or the photographer has legal right to access, for example Byways Open to All Traffic or a public right of way or an area of open access land. The Metropolitan Police state in their own advice "Members of the public and the media do not need a permit to film or photograph in public places and police have no power to stop them filming or photographing incidents or police personnel". The IAC, Film and Video Institute recommends that one follows instruction given by police as there may be a reason/reasons for not filming, ignorance of said law(s) notwithstanding. An exception is an area that has prohibitions detailed within anti terrorism legislation. Civil proceeding can be taken if a person is filmed without consent, and privacy laws exist to protect a person where they can expect privacy. Two public locations in the UK, Trafalgar Square and Parliament Square, have a specific provision against photography for commercial purposes without the written permission of the Mayor or the Squares' Management Team and paying a fee, and permission is needed to photograph or film for commercial purposes in the Royal Parks or on any National Trust land.

Persistent and aggressive photography of a single individual may come under the legal definition of harassment.

It is contempt of court to take a photograph in any court of law of any person, being a judge of the court or a juror or a witness in or a party to any proceedings before the court, whether civil or criminal, or to publish such a photograph. This includes photographs taken in a court building or the precincts of the court.
Taking a photograph in a court can be seen as a serious offence, leading to a prison sentence. The prohibition on taking photographs in the precincts is vague. It was designed to prevent the undermining of the dignity of the court, through the exploitation of images in low brow "picture papers".

Photography of certain subject matter is restricted in the United Kingdom. In particular, the Protection of Children Act 1978 restricts making or possessing pornography of children under 18, or what looks like pornography of under-18s. There is no law prohibiting photographing children in public spaces.

Taking photographs on private property is also legal. The landowner may, as a condition of granting entry to the private property, choose to place conditions or restrictions on photography, but the only consequence of failure to comply with these conditions is the photographer being required to leave. Landowners and their agents cannot inspect or delete, or require the deletion of, photographs taken this way.

Anti-terrorism law
It is an offence under the Counter-Terrorism Act 2008 to publish or communicate a photograph of a constable (not including PCSOs), a member of the armed forces, or a member of the security services, which is of a kind likely to be useful to a person committing or preparing an act of terrorism. There is a defence of acting with a reasonable excuse; however, the burden of proof is on the defence, under section 58A of the Terrorism Act 2000. A PCSO in 2009 cited Section 44 of the Terrorism Act 2000 to prevent a member of the public photographing him. Section 44 actually concerns stop and search powers. However, in January 2010 the stop-and-search powers granted under Section 44 were ruled illegal by the European Court of Human Rights.

While the Act does not prohibit photography, critics have alleged that powers granted to police under Section 44 have been misused to prevent lawful public photography. Notable instances have included the investigation of a schoolboy, a Member of Parliament and a BBC photographer. The scope of these powers has since been reduced, and guidance around them issued to discourage their use in relation to photography, following litigation in the European Court of Human Rights.

Following a prolonged campaign, including a series of demonstrations by photographers dealt with by police officers and PCSOs,  the Metropolitan Police was forced to issue updated legal advice which confirms that "Members of the public and the media do not need a permit to film or photograph in public places and police have no power to stop them filming or photographing incidents or police personnel" and that "The power to stop and search someone under Section 44 of the Terrorism Act 2000 no longer exists."

It is an offence under section 58 of the Terrorism Act 2000 to take a photograph of a kind likely to be useful to a person committing or preparing an act of terrorism, or possessing such a photograph. There is an identical defence of reasonable excuse. As such, it must be of a kind likely to provide practical assistance to a person committing or preparing an act of terrorism. Whether the photograph in question is such is a matter for a jury, which is not required to look at the surrounding circumstances. The photograph must contain information of such a nature as to raise a reasonable suspicion that it was intended to be used to assist in the preparation or commission of an act of terrorism. It must call for an explanation. A photograph which is innocuous on its face will not fall foul of the provision if the prosecution adduces evidence that it was intended to be used for the purpose of committing or preparing a terrorist act. The defence may prove a reasonable excuse simply by showing that the photograph is possessed for a purpose other than to assist in the commission or preparation of an act of terrorism, even if the purpose of possession is otherwise unlawful.

Copyright

Copyright can subsist in an original photograph, i.e. a recording of light or other radiation on any medium on which an image is produced or from which an image by any means be produced, and which is not part of a film. Whilst photographs are classified as artistic works, the subsistence of copyright does not depend on artistic merit. The owner of the copyright in the photograph is the photographer – the person who creates it, by default. However, where a photograph is taken by an employee in the course of employment, the first owner of the copyright is the employer, unless there is an agreement to the contrary.

Copyright which subsists in a photograph protects not merely the photographer from direct copying of his/her work, but also from indirect copying to reproduce his/her work, where a substantial part of his/her work has been copied.

Copyright in a photograph lasts for 70 years from the end of the year in which the photographer dies. A consequence of this lengthy period of existence of the copyright is that many family photographs which have no market value, but significant emotional value, remain subject to copyright, even when the original photographer cannot be traced (a problem known as copyright orphan), has given up photography, or died. In the absence of a licence, it will be an infringement of copyright in the photographs to copy them. When someone dies the rights will have transferred to someone else, perhaps through testamentary deposition (a will) or by inheritance. If there was no will, or if the photographer has not specified where the rights in the material should go, then the normal rules of inheritance will apply (although these rules are not specific to copyright and legal advice should be sought). Scanning old family photographs, without permission, to a digital file for personal use is prima facie an infringement of copyright.

Certain photographs may not be protected by copyright. Section 171(3) of the Copyright, Designs and Patents Act 1988 gives courts jurisdiction to refrain from enforcing the copyright which subsists in works on the grounds of public interest. For example, patent diagrams are held to be in the public domain, and are thus not subject to copyright.

Infringement

Infringement of the copyright which subsists in a photograph can be performed through copying the photograph. This is because the owner of the copyright in the photograph has the exclusive right to copy the photograph. For there to be infringement of the copyright in a photograph, there must be copying of a substantial part of the photograph.
A photograph can also be a mechanism of infringement of the copyright which subsists in another work. For example, a photograph which copies a substantial part of an artistic work, such as a sculpture, painting or another photograph (without permission) would infringe the copyright which subsists in those works.

However, the subject matter of a photograph is not necessarily subject to an independent copyright. For example, in the Creation Records case, a photographer, attempting to create a photograph for an album cover, set up an elaborate and artificial scene. A photographer from a newspaper covertly photographed the scene and published it in the newspaper. The court held that the newspaper photographer did not infringe the official photographer's copyright. Copyright did not subsist in the scene itself – it was too temporary to be a collage, and could not be categorised as any other form of artistic work.

Richard Arnold has criticized the protection of photographs in this manner on two grounds. Firstly, it is argued that photographs should not be protected as artistic works, but should instead be protected in a manner similar to that of sound recordings and films. In other words, copyright should not protect the subject matter of a photograph as a matter of course as a consequence of a photograph being taken. It is argued that protection of photographs as artistic works is anomalous, in that photography is ultimately a medium of reproduction, rather than creation. As such, it is more similar to a film, or sound, recording than a painting or sculpture. Some photographers share this view. For example, Michael Reichmann described photography as an art of disclosure, as opposed to an art of inclusion. Secondly, it is argued that the protection of photographs as artistic works leads to bizarre results. Subject matter is protected irrespective of the artistic merit of a photograph. The subject matter of a photograph is protected even when it is not deserving of protection. For copyright to subsist in photographs as artistic works, the photographs must be original, since the English test for originality is based on skill, labour and judgment. That said, it is possible that the threshold of originality is very low. Essentially, by this, Arnold is arguing that whilst the subject matter of some photographs may deserve protection, it is inappropriate for the law to presume that the subject matter of all photographs is deserving of protection.

It is possible to say with a high degree of confidence that photographs of three-dimensional objects, including artistic works, will be treated by a court as themselves original artistic works, and as such, will be subject to copyright. It is likely that a photograph (including a scan – digital scanning counts as photography for the purposes of the Copyright Designs and Patents Act 1988) of a two dimensional artistic work, such as another photograph or a painting will also be subject to copyright if a significant amount of skill, labour and judgment went into its creation.

Photography and privacy
A right to privacy came into existence in UK law as a consequence of the incorporation of the European Convention on Human Rights into domestic law through the Human Rights Act 1998. This can result in restrictions on the publication of photography.

Whether this right is caused by horizontal effect of the Human Rights Act 1998 or is judicially created is a matter of some controversy. The right to privacy is protected by Article 8 of the convention. In the context of photography, it stands at odds to the Article 10 right of freedom of expression. As such, courts will consider the public interest in balancing the rights through the legal test of proportionality.

A very limited statutory right to privacy exists in the Copyright, Designs and Patents Act 1988. This right is held, for example, by someone who hires a photographer to photograph their wedding. The commissioner, irrespective of any copyright which he does or does not hold in the photograph, of a photograph which was commissioned for private and domestic purposes, where copyright subsists in the photograph, has the right not to have copies of the work issued to the public, the work exhibited in public or the work communicated to the public. However, this right will not be infringed if the rightholder gives permission. It will not be infringed if the photograph is incidentally included in an artistic work, film, or broadcast.

United States

Local, state, and national laws govern still and motion photography. Laws vary between jurisdictions, and what is not illegal in one place may be illegal in another. Typical laws in the United States are as follows:

Public property

It is legal to photograph or videotape anything and anyone on any public property, within reasonable community standards.
Photographing or videotaping a tourist attraction, whether publicly or privately owned, is generally considered legal, unless explicitly prohibited by a specific law or statute.

Private property
Photography may be prohibited or restricted by a property owner on their property. However, a property owner generally cannot restrict the photographing of the property by individuals who are not within the bounds of the property.
Photography on private property that is generally open to the public (e.g., a shopping mall) is usually permitted unless explicitly prohibited by posted signs. Even if no such signs are posted, the property owner or agent can ask a person to stop photographing, and if the person refuses to do so, the owner or agent can ask the person to leave; in some jurisdictions, a person who refuses to leave can be arrested for criminal trespass, and many jurisdictions recognize the common-law right to use reasonable force to remove a trespasser; a person who forcibly resists a lawful removal may be liable for battery, assault, or both.

Outer space
Remote sensing of the earth from outer space is regulated by the National Oceanic and Atmospheric Administration which requires that a license be issued in advance.

Privacy issues

 Photographing private property from within the public domain is not illegal, with the exception of an area that is generally regarded as private, such as a bedroom, bathroom, or hotel room.  In some states there is no definition of "private," in which case, there is a general expectation of privacy.  Should the subjects not attempt to conceal their private affairs, their actions immediately become public to a photographer using normal photographic equipment.
 In the US, there are multiple laws prohibiting photographing a person's genitalia without that person's permission. This also applies to any filming of another within a public restroom or locker room. Some jurisdictions have banned the use of a telephone with camera functionality within a restroom or locker room in order to prevent this. The United States enacted the Video Voyeurism Prevention Act of 2004 to punish those who intentionally capture an individual's genitalia without consent, when the person knew the subject had an expectation of privacy. State laws have also been passed addressing this issue.

Commercial photography
In certain locations, such as California State Parks, commercial photography requires a permit and sometimes proof of insurance. In places such as the city of Hermosa Beach in California, commercial photography on both public property and private property is subject to permit regulations and possibly also insurance requirements.
At the Chesapeake and Ohio Canal National Historical Park, commercial photography requires a permit under certain circumstances. For photography that involves the advertising of a commercial product or service, or photography that involves sets or props or models, a permit is required. In addition, if the photography has aspects that may be disruptive to others, such as additional equipment or a significant number of personnel or the use of public areas for more than four hours, it is necessary to obtain a permit. If a photographer or related personnel need to access an area during a time when the area is normally closed, or if access to a restricted area is involved, the photography requires a permit. For commercial portrait photographers, there is a streamlined process for photography permits. In the case of National Park system units, commercial filming or audio recording requires a permit and liability insurance. Still photography that uses models or props for the purpose of commercial advertising requires a permit and proof of insurance.
If a photograph shows private property in such a manner that a viewer of the photograph can identify the owner of the property, the ASMP (American Society of Media Photographers, Inc.) recommends that a property release should be used if the photograph is to be used for advertising or commercial purposes. According to the ASMP, a property release may be a requirement in such a situation.

Other issues
Photographing or videoing accident scenes and law enforcement or emergency activities is usually legal, as long as a person does not interfere with their response or situation. *Any filming with the intent of doing unlawful harm against a subject may be a violation of the law in itself.

Canada
Federal legislation governs the questions of copyright and criminal offences with respect to photography. Otherwise, the common law (in Quebec, the Civil Code of Quebec), generally determines when photography can take place.

 The Copyright Act provides that the duration of copyright for a photograph is the life of the author plus 50 years. Freedom of panorama is also allowed, with respect to photographs of sculptures and architectural works, and there is also protection for those who "incidentally and not deliberately include a work or other subject-matter in another work or other subject-matter."
 The Criminal Code provides for punishment of various offences, including voyeurism, child pornography, trespassing at night, and paparazzi behaviour.
 The law of defamation, trespass and privacy is governed at the provincial level.
 The common-law provinces of British Columbia, Manitoba, Newfoundland and Labrador, Ontario and Saskatchewan have enacted privacy legislation dealing with personality rights, which supplement the law of trespass.
 In Quebec, the Civil Code goes further by specifying that "keeping ... private life under observation by any means" constitutes an additional ground of invasion of privacy. In Aubry v Éditions Vice-Versa Inc, the Supreme Court of Canada held that, because of that, supplemented by Quebec's Charter of Human Rights and Freedoms privacy provisions, a photographer can take photographs in public places but may not publish them unless permission has been obtained from the subject, except where the subject appears in an incidental manner, or whose professional success depends on public opinion.

Hong Kong

In some public property owned by government, such as law courts, government buildings, libraries, civic centres  and some of the museums in Hong Kong, photography is not allowed without permission from the government. It is illegal to equip or take photographs and recording in a place of public entertainment, such as cinemas and indoor theaters.

In private property, photography may be prohibited or restricted by a property owner on their property.

Photography on private property that is generally open to the public (e.g., a shopping mall) is usually permitted unless explicitly prohibited by posted signs. Even if no such signs are posted, the property owner or agent can ask a person to stop photographing, and if the person refuses to do so, the owner or agent can ask the person to leave; in some jurisdictions, a person who refuses to leave can be arrested for criminal trespass, and many jurisdictions recognize the common-law right to use reasonable force to remove a trespasser; a person who forcibly resists a lawful removal may be liable for battery, assault, or both.

Hungary

In Hungary, from 15 March 2014 when the long-awaited Civil Code was published, the law re-stated what had been normal practice, namely, that a person had the right to refuse being photographed. However, implied consent exists: it is not illegal to photograph a person who does not actively object.

Iceland
Calling oneself a photographer, in line with most other trades in Iceland, requires the person to hold a Journeyman's or Master's Certificates in the industry. Exceptions can be made in low population areas, or for people coming from within the EEA.

Macau
In Macau, a photographer must not take or publish any photographs of a person against his/her will without legal justification, even in a public place. Besides, everyone has a right to Personality Rights. People are not to be photographed, photographs of them displayed or reproduced without their prior consent. Criminal penalties include imprisonment. Additionally, photography of police officers in Macau is illegal.

Mexico
Mexican law is similar to the law in the United States. Authorities may intimidate or prevent any holder of a camera if they come into close perimeters of Government buildings.

Philippines
There has been a controversy among Filipino photographers and establishment managements. On June 12, 2013, Philippine Independence Day, pro-photography group, Bawal Mag-Shoot dito, launched at the Freedom to Shoot Day protest at Rizal Park. The group protested for their right to take photos of historical and public places, especially in Luneta and Intramuros. The park management imposed a fee for D-SLR photographers to shoot images for commercial purposes but it was also reported that security guards also charge 500 pesos to shoot photos even for non-commercial purposes, an act which the advocacy group branded as "extortion". The group also claimed that there is discrimination against Filipino photographers and claimed that the management is lenient on foreign photographers. There is no official policy on taking photographs of historical places and the group has called legislators to create a law on the matter.

The Department of Tourism, in their November 15, 2011 press release, clarified that everyone is permitted to take photographs at Rizal Park and Intramuros for personal or souvenir purposes. The department stated that prior permission from the National Parks Development Committee (NPDC, for Rizal Park) or the Intramuros Administration (for Intramuros) is needed for shoots of commercial nature, "to ensure that the well-being of the photographers are taken care of, as well as make certain that everything goes smoothly during the shoot."

The NPDC issued rules in 2018 aimed at regulating photography and videography at both Rizal and Paco Parks, after an incident wherein filmmaker Chris Cahilig and boy band 1:43 were intercepted by the personnel of Rizal Park for failing to secure permission from NPDC before doing a video session. While casual snapshots for personal or souvenir purposes through mobile phones and simple cameras are tolerated, prior permission is required for photography and videography of the parks for commercial, professional, reporting, interviewing, and special occasion purposes, as well as sessions that may cause disruption at the parks. Additionally, consent from the National Historical Commission of the Philippines (NHCP) is necessary for shoots involving both the Rizal Monument and the Philippine Flag. Cahilig reacted to the policy, calling it "anti-tourism" and "backward".

South Africa
In South Africa photographing people in public is legal. Reproducing and selling photographs of people is legal for editorial and limited fair use commercial purposes. There exists no case law to define what the limits on commercial use are. Civil law requires the consent of any identifiable persons for advertorial and promotional purposes. Property, including animals, do not enjoy any special consideration.

During the media coverage of the Nkandla controversy it emerged that there exists a law, the National Key Points Act, 1980, prohibiting the photographing of any "national key points." National key points are buildings or structures that serve a strategic or military purpose. Though it wasn't revealed what these are as part of state secrecy it was claimed that the presidential residence is one of them and should thus not be shown in media. Subsequent court action resulted in it being ruled that a list of all key points be made public. Although not currently or previously enforced the law is still in effect even after calls for it to be repealed as a relic of apartheid-era secrecy legislation.

Spain
Taking pictures or recording police officers is legal, what is a serious offence to share or publish those images if:

 they could put at risk the police officers and their families from harassment 
 they could put at risk a planned police operation 
 taken at a strategic or classified facilities.

If none of the 3 mentioned cases apply, it is only legal to share those images if the faces, voices and any identity signs are removed.

Sudan and South Sudan
Travelers who wish to take any photographs must obtain a photography permit from the Ministry of Interior, Department of Aliens (Sudan) or Ministry of Information (South Sudan).

See also
Freedom of panorama
Google Street View privacy concerns
Image copyright (Germany)
Legality of recording by civilians
Ballot selfie
Model release
Public domain

Notes

References

External links
Bert P. Krages Attorney at Law Photographer's Rights Page Information about photographers' rights in the US
European Court of Human Rights case law factsheet on the right to one's own image
Photography and the Law Photography and the Law Legal Updates
Canadian laws with regard to photography
Digital Rights Ireland » Photographer’s Rights
UK Photographers Rights
Australian street photography legal issues
I’m a Photographer, Not a Terrorist!, a UK group set up to fight unnecessary and draconian restrictions against individuals taking photographs in public spaces
Worldwide Photographer's Rights free ebook

Privacy law
Photography
Copyright law
Intellectual property law